Dorsal Atlântica is a Brazilian thrash metal band founded in Rio de Janeiro in 1981. They were pioneers of the Brazilian thrash metal scene, being acknowledged as an influence to many other bands including Sepultura and Korzus.

The band's first work appears on the split album Ultimatum with another Rio de Janeiro-based band, Metalmorphose, in 1984. Afterwards, Dorsal Atlântica released a string of studio albums from 1984 to 1998, before breaking up in 2001.

Most their lyrics were written in Portuguese. Some of their work contains two versions (English/Portuguese), and four albums are fully in English.

Dorsal Atlântica was always led by guitarist/vocalist Carlos 'Vândalo' Lopes. From 2001 until 2008 he recorded several albums with the psychedelic/high energy rock band called Mustang and with the Brazilian groove/rock band Usina Le Blond.

Discography

Demos 
 1st Demo (1982)

Studio albums 
 Ultimatum (split) (1985)
 Antes do Fim (1986)
 Dividir & Conquistar (1988)
 Searching for the Light (1990)
 Musical Guide from Stellium (1992)
 Alea Jacta Est (1994)
 Straight (1996)
 Antes do Fim, Depois do Fim (re-recording of Antes do Fim album) (2005)
 2012 (2012)
 Imperium (2014)
 Canudos (2017)
 Pandemia(2021)

EPs 
 Cheap Tapes from Divide & Conquer (1988)

Live albums 
 Terrorism Alive (1999)

Compilation albums 
 Ultimatum Outtakes 1982–1985 (2002)
 Pelagodiscus Atlanticus (The Old, The Rare, The New) (2002)
 Depois do Fim (After the End) (2014)

References

External links 
 [ Dorsal Atlântica] at Allmusic

Brazilian heavy metal musical groups
Brazilian thrash metal musical groups
Musical groups established in 1981
Musical groups disestablished in 2001
Musical groups reestablished in 2012
1981 establishments in Brazil
2001 disestablishments in Brazil
2012 establishments in Brazil